Firebird is a floorless roller coaster located at Six Flags America in Prince George's County, Maryland. The roller coaster had originally debuted in 1990 as a stand-up roller coaster named Iron Wolf at Six Flags Great America. It was later relocated to Six Flags America in 2012 and renamed Apocalypse, under which it operated until 2018.

The roller coaster was the first to be built by Swiss manufacturer Bolliger & Mabillard. When known as Iron Wolf, the roller coaster briefly held world records among stand-up roller coasters for height and speed before being surpassed several years later.

History

Six Flags Great America (1990–2011)

On April 28, 1990, Apocalypse opened as Iron Wolf at Six Flags Great America on the former site of Z-Force (the only Intamin Space Diver ever manufactured). It debuted in 1990 as the tallest and fastest stand-up roller coaster in the world.

In 1994, Iron Wolf appeared in the movie Richie Rich as Richie's backyard roller coaster.

On August 5, 2011, Six Flags Great America announced on their official Facebook page that the Iron Wolf would be closed on September 5, 2011: "After a long 21 year history at the park, we will be removing Iron Wolf. Make sure to get your last rides in – Iron Wolf’s Last Stand is September 5". 'The Last Stand' is also a reference to the slogan afforded to Apocalypse. Iron Wolf's former site would be taken over in 2014 by a custom RMC coaster, Goliath.

Six Flags America (2012–present)

Apocalypse (2012–18)

On August 22, 2011, Six Flags America announced on their Facebook page that they would be adding a new attraction in 2012. From this day, the park began to slowly remove burnt pieces from an envelope each days leading up to the official announcement on September 1, 2011. On September 1, 2011, Six Flags America announced that they would be adding Apocalypse in 2012.

Iron Wolf closed on September 5, 2011, and work began on preparing it for transport to its new location. The new owners planned to add the roller coaster to the Skull Island section of their park, but before the relocation could take place, the Skull Mountain ride at Six Flags America had to be closed and demolished to make room for the new attraction. Vertical construction of Apocalypse began in February 2012. This continued until the end of March 2012 when the final piece of track was installed.

The official Facebook page for Six Flags America had stated that the ride would officially open on May 25, 2012, but this was later changed to June 7, 2012.

Firebird (2019–present)
On August 16, 2018, the park announced on their social media platforms that Apocalypse would close on September 8, 2018. On August 30, 2018, instead of being demolished or relocated, it was announced that Apocalypse would be converted into a floorless coaster and renamed Firebird for the 2019 season. Firebird opened on May 3, 2019, to Six Flags members with a Platinum membership or higher. It opened to the public on May 17, 2019.

Meanwhile, the former Apocalypse train was being donated to the National Roller Coaster Museum.

Ride experience
After departing the station, the train makes a 180 degree turn leading to the  chain lift hill. Once at the top, the train goes through a pre-drop before making a sharp left hand turn leading into the first drop. Once the train is at the bottom of the first drop, it immediately goes through the first of two inversions, a vertical loop. The train then makes an upward right turn before making a left turn back down to the ground. The train continues to go left before going through an upward helix. After, the train makes a downward right s-bend leading into the second and final inversion, a corkscrew. The train makes a left turn back up before going through another s-bend, small over-banked turn which leads to the brake run.

Trains
Firebird operates with two floorless trains. Each train has six rows with four each for a total of 24 riders per train.

When the roller coaster was known as Iron Wolf, both trains featured the face of a wolf on the front of the train. After the ride was relocated to Six Flags America, the wolf was removed and the word "Apocalypse" replaced it.

Track
The track spine is painted orange and the rails red. The supports are dark gray.

When the coaster was known as Iron Wolf at Six Flags Great America, the track was brown.

Theme
Between 1990 and 2011, when Apocalypse was known as Iron Wolf, there was no theme for the roller coaster. After its relocation to Six Flags America, to match the new name of the coaster, an end of the world apocalypse theme was added with fire, crashed planes and zombies located in the queue line and along the layout of the roller coaster. As guests went further in the queue line to the end at the station, it mimicked an end of the world apocalypse scenario. The skull from Skull Mountain also serves as a backdrop to the ride.

After being converted to Firebird, much of the Apocalypse theming has been removed. The fire effect is still used, however.

See also
 2011 in amusement parks
 2012 in amusement parks
 2019 in amusement parks

References

External links

Apocalypse at Six Flags America's website
Apocalypse at the Roller Coaster DataBase

Roller coasters in Maryland
Roller coasters operated by Six Flags
Six Flags America
Floorless Coaster roller coasters manufactured by Bolliger & Mabillard
Roller coasters introduced in 2019
Amusement rides that closed in 2018